Red light or redlight may refer to:

Science and technology
 Red, any of a number of similar colors evoked by light in the wavelength range of 630–740 nm
 Red light, a traffic light color signifying stop
 Red light, a color of safelight used in photographic darkrooms
 Red light therapy

Arts and entertainment
 Red Lights (novel) (Feux Rouges), a 1953 book by Georges Simenon

Film
 Red Lights (1923 film), a 1923 American silent film
 Red Light (film), a 1949 crime film starring George Raft
 Red Lights (2004 film) (Feux rouges), a French thriller directed by Cédric Kahn
 Red Lights (2012 film), a thriller by Rodrigo Cortés
 Redlight (film), a 2009 documentary film

Music
 Red Light, a sublabel of Tunnel Records
 Redlight (musician) (born 1980), British electronic musician

Albums
 Red Light (Bladee album), 2018
 Red Light (f(x) album), 2014
 Redlight (Grails album), 2004
 Redlight (The Slackers album), 1997

Songs
 "Red Light" (Linda Clifford song)
 "Red Light" (David Nail song)
 "Red Light" (Siouxsie and the Banshees song)
 "Red Light" (U2 song)
 "Red Light", by Fastball from Keep Your Wig On
 "Red Light", by Jonny Lang from Long Time Coming
 "Red Light", by Eddie Murphy, featuring Snoop Dogg
 "Red Light", by The Strokes from First Impressions of Earth
 "Red Light", by Wall of Voodoo from Dark Continent
 "Redlight" (song), by Ian Carey
 "Redlight", by Kelly Osbourne from Sleeping in the Nothing
 "Red Lights" (song), by Tiësto
 "Red Lights" (Stray Kids song)
 "Red Lights", by Chloe x Halle from Sugar Symphony

Other uses
 Redlight Children Campaign, an American non-profit organization
 Common synonym for goals in ice hockey, derived from the red lamp behind the net activated to confirm a goal
 André Racicot (born 1969), nicknamed "Red Light", retired ice hockey goalie
 Operation Red Light II, a 2006 coalition military operation of the Iraq War

See also
 Red-light district, a part of an urban area where there is a concentration of prostitution and sex-oriented businesses
 Red Light Lizzie (fl. 1860–1875), a 19th-century madam and underworld figure in New York City
 Red light/Green light, a traditional children's game
 Red Lantern (disambiguation)
 Green light (disambiguation)

Light, red